During the 2004–05 English football season, Nottingham Forest competed in the Football League Championship.

Season summary
Manager Joe Kinnear was hoping to push for promotion from the newly named Coca-Cola Championship in 2004–05, but the start to the season was poor. Despite a promising draw with Wigan on the first day of the season (the game which started a run of four consecutive draws), the team's form and league position went downhill. With fans becoming restless, and the threat of demonstrations against the team management, Kinnear resigned in December after a 3–0 defeat to arch-rivals Derby County at Pride Park left Forest struggling at the foot of the Championship. 
Following Mick Harford's brief reign as caretaker, in January 2005, Gary Megson was named as Nottingham Forest's new manager. He had previously won promotion to the Premiership twice with West Bromwich Albion, having taken over at a time when they were on the verge of relegation to League One, and it was hoped that he could achieve the same success with Forest. After a loss to Millwall in Megson's first match in charge, a six-game unbeaten run gave the fans hope that survival might be on the cards. However, Forest would win only one more league game all season after that, and they finished second from bottom in the Coca-Cola Championship and were relegated to League One. This made them the first former European Cup winners to suffer relegation to the third tier of their domestic league.

Final league table

Results
Nottingham Forest's score comes first

Legend

Football League Championship

FA Cup

League Cup

Squad

Left club during season

Appearances

References

Nottingham Forest F.C.